Claudia Reichler  (born 10 October 1963) is a German former footballer. She was a member of the Germany women's national football team from 1982–1985. On club level she played for BV 08 Lüttringhausen and KBC Duisburg.

References

External links
 
 Profile at soccerdonna.de

1963 births
Living people
German women's footballers
Place of birth missing (living people)
Germany women's international footballers
Women's association football goalkeepers